Victor (Viorel) Bologan (born 14 December 1971) is a Moldovan chess player and author. He was awarded the title of Grandmaster by FIDE in 1991.

Career 
Bologan won the first two editions of the Poikovsky Karpov International Tournament, in 2000 and 2001. He tied for first in the same tournament in 2005 and 2015. In 2003 he won the Aeroflot Open and the Dortmund Sparkassen Chess Meeting.

He won the 2005 Canadian Open Chess Championship. Bologan tied for first place in the 2006 Aeroflot Open, finishing second on tiebreak. In May 2010, he tied for first with Wang Hao and Zahar Efimenko at the Bosna International open in Sarajevo.

Bologan played for Moldova in the Chess Olympiad in 1992 - 1998 and 2002 - 2014.

Education 
Bologan graduated from the Moscow Physical Culture and Sports Institute in 1993. In 1996, he successfully defended a doctoral thesis on the structure of preparation of high level chess players at the Russian State University of Physical Education, Sport, Youth and Tourism.

Personal life 
He is married to Margarita Bologan and they have three children.

Books 
 Bologan, Victor (2007). Victor Bologan. Selected Games 1985–2004. Russell Enterprises Inc. 
 Bologan, Victor (2008). The Chebanenko Slav According to Bologan. New In Chess. .
 Bologan, Victor (2009). The King's Indian According to Bologan. A Complete Black Repertoire. Chess Stars. .
 Bologan, Victor (2011). The Rossolimo Sicilian. New In Chess. . 
 Bologan, Victor (2012). The Powerful Catalan. A Complete Repertoire for White. New In Chess. .
 Bologan, Victor (2014). Bologan's Black Weapons in the Open Games. How to Play for a Win if White Avoids the Ruy Lopez. New In Chess. .
 Bologan, Victor (2015). Bologan's Ruy Lopez for Black. How to Play for a Win against the Spanish Opening. New In Chess. 
 Bologan, Victor (2017). Bologan's King's Indian. A Modern Reportoire for Black. New In Chess. 
 Bologan, Victor (2018). Bologan's Caro-Kann. A Modern Repertoire for Black. New In Chess.

ChessBase Fritztrainer opening DVDs
 Bologan, Viktor (2009). The King's Indian. Fritztrainer opening DVD, ChessBase. .
 Bologan, Viktor (2009). The Caro–Kann. Fritztrainer opening DVD, ChessBase. .
 Bologan, Viktor (2010). The Sicilian Rossolimo for White. Fritztrainer opening DVD, ChessBase.
 Bologan, Viktor (2010). The Fighting Philidor. Fritztrainer opening DVD, ChessBase.
 Bologan, Viktor (2011). Beating the Sicilian: Grandmaster Bologan's Repertoire Vol. 1, 2 and 3. Fritztrainer opening DVD, ChessBase.
 Bologan, Viktor. The Catalan: A complete repertoire for White! Fritztrainer opening DVD, ChessBase.
 Bologan, Viktor. Fit for the French. Fritztrainer opening DVD, ChessBase.

References

External links 

Victor Bologan chess games at 365Chess.com

Profile of Victor Bologan.
Bisik-Bisik with GM Victor Bologan

1971 births
Living people
Chess grandmasters
Chess Olympiad competitors
Chess writers
Chess players from Chișinău
Russian State University of Physical Education, Sport, Youth and Tourism, Department of Chess alumni